PROUD can mean:

 People for Real, Open and United Democracy, a Bulgarian political party
 PROUD (clinical trial), a clinical trial of post-exposure prophylaxis
 PROUD (labour union), a Dutch labour union